Partners in Crime is a 1973 American TV movie directed by Jack Smight. It was the pilot for a prospective series about a judge who becomes a private investigator.  NBC did not pick it up as a series but the pilot screened as a stand alone movie.

Plot
Judge Meredith Leland becomes a private investigator along with a paroled convict.

Cast
Lee Grant as Judge Meredith Leland
Lou Antonio
Robert Cummings as Ralph Elsworth
Harry Guardino as Walt Connors
Richard Jaeckel as Frank Jordan
Charles Drake as Lieutenant Fred Harnett
Richard Anderson as Roger Goldsmith
William Schallert as Oscar
Lorraine Gary as Margery Jordan
Gary Crosby as Trooper

Production
The film was announced in December 1972.

Reception
The show was the equal 27th highest rated program that week.

References

External links
Partners in Crime at BFI
Partners in Crime at IMDb

1973 television films
1973 films
Films directed by Jack Smight